Lubnā bint Hājar was a wife of Abd al-Muttalib and the mother of Abū Lahab.

Her father, Hajar ibn Abd Manaf ibn Datir ibn Hubashiya ibn Salul ibn Ka'b ibn 'Amr, was from the Khuza'a tribe. Her mother, Hind bint 'Amr ibn Ka'b ibn Sa'd ibn Taym ibn Murra, was from the Taym clan of the Quraysh, hence a relative of Abu Bakr. Hind's mother was Sawda bint Zuhra ibn Kilab, making Hind a first cousin of Amina bint Wahb and Lubna a second cousin of the Islamic prophet Muhammad.

By her marriage to Abd al-Muttalib, Lubna had one son, Abd al-Uzza, known as Abu Lahab ("flame man") "because of his beauty and charm".

According to later Muslim historians, Lubna was known as al-Samajij, which could mean "ill-favoured" (ugly) or even "without any good quality".

References

Year of birth missing
Year of death missing
Family of Muhammad
6th-century Arabs